The 1988 Air Canada Cup was Canada's 10th annual national midget 'AAA' hockey championship, which was played in April 1988 at the Fort William Gardens in Thunder Bay, Ontario.  The Regina Pat Canadians defeated the Calgary NorthStars to win their second national title. The host Thunder Bay Bearcats won the bronze medal.  Calgary's Wes Walz was named Most Valuable Player.  Other future National Hockey League players playing in this tournament were Greg Johnson, Rob Pearson, Chris Snell, Brent Thompson, and Dale Craigwell.

Teams

Round robin

Standings

Scores

Regina 5 - Thunder Bay 1
Fredericton 4 - Laval Laurentides-Lanaudiere 3
Oshawa 2 - Calgary 1
Thunder Bay 4 - Fredericton 2
Regina 6 - Laval Laurentides-Lanaudiere 6
Thunder Bay 3 - Oshawa 1
Calgary 8 - Laval Laurentides-Lanaudiere 5
Regina 7 -Fredericton 2
Calgary 6 - Thunder Bay 4
Oshawa 4 - Laval Laurentides-Lanaudiere 3
Calgary 6 - Regina 3
Oshawa 5 - Fredericton 2
Thunder Bay 6 - Laval Laurentides-Lanaudiere 1
Regina 6 - Oshawa 2
Calgary 5 - Fredericton 0

Playoffs

Semi-finals
Calgary 6 - Oshawa 4
Regina 4 - Thunder Bay 3 (2OT)

Bronze-medal game
Thunder Bay 5 - Oshawa 4

Gold-medal game
Regina 7 - Calgary 4

Individual awards
Most Valuable Player: Wes Walz (Calgary)
Most Sportsmanlike Player: Jason Bortolussi (Thunder Bay)

See also
Telus Cup

References

External links
Telus Cup Website
Hockey Canada-Telus Cup Guide and Record Book

Telus Cup
Air Canada Cup
Sports competitions in Thunder Bay
April 1988 sports events in Canada